The Stade Océane (or Grand Stade du Havre) is a football stadium in Le Havre, France. Its capacity is 25,178 all-seated and it is the home ground of Le Havre AC. It replaces the Stade Jules Deschaseaux as the club's home stadium. Its inauguration was 12 July 2012, with a friendly fixture between Le Havre AC and Lille.

2019 FIFA Women's World Cup 

The stadium was chosen to host matches up to the quarter-finals of the 2019 FIFA Women's World Cup.

References

Football venues in France
Le Havre AC
Sports venues in Seine-Maritime
Buildings and structures in Le Havre
Sports venues completed in 2012
2019 FIFA Women's World Cup stadiums
21st-century architecture in France